Daphnis torenia is a species of moth of the family Sphingidae first described by Herbert Druce in 1882. It is found in the Pacific, including Fiji, the New Hebrides and Hawaii.

It was considered a subspecies of Daphnis placida for some time, but was reinstated as a species. The forewing upperside is similar to Daphnis placida placida, but the proximal edge of the olive-green median area is straight, very feebly or not at all incurved on the costa and the antemedian line is barely visible.

References

Daphnis (moth)
Moths described in 1882